Seethakoka Chilaka is a 1981 Indian Telugu-language romance film directed by Bharathiraja. The film was produced by Edida Nageswara Raa on Poornodaya Movie Creations banner and was simultaneously shot alongside its Tamil version titled Alaigal Oivathillai. Murali (credited as Karthik in Tamil) played the lead role in both versions of the film, making his career debut in both the language versions simultaneously. Mucherla Aruna plays the female lead, while Radha played the same character in the Tamil version. Aruna and Radha made their acting debuts in each of the versions of the film. The film was retrospectively featured in the Indian Panorama section of the 9th International Film Festival of India, 1983. The film won five Nandi Awards.

Plot 
Raghu and the men of his village roam the village teasing girls. One day Karuna enters the village. Raghu and his friends make mischief with her but when they come to know that Karuna is David's sister, they become afraid of her. Raghu's mother is a classical music teacher. Karuna wants to learn classical singing, hence she goes to Raghu's house. Slowly Raghu and Karuna fall in love with each other. When Raghu's mother learns of their love, she warns Raghu about the difference between him and Karuna. Karuna belongs to a Christian community, whereas Raghu is a Hindu. Moreover, Karuna's brother David is a heartless person who may even kill Raghu for loving Karuna. But Raghu and Karuna explore their love even when all the villagers are against them. They leave the village to fly to their lovely world, like butterflies, hence the title Seethakoka Chilaka.

Cast 
 Murali as Raghu
 Aruna as Karuna
 Sharath Babu as David
 Silk Smitha
 Jaggayya
 Dubbing Janaki
 Rallapalli
 Ali (child artist)

Soundtrack 
The music was composed by Ilaiyaraaja, with lyrics by Veturi.

Accolades 
 National Film Awards – 1981
 Best Feature Film in Telugu

 Nandi Awards – 1981
 Best Feature Film – Gold – Edida Nageswara Rao
 Best Director – Bharathiraja
 Best Supporting Actor – Sarath Babu
 Best Music Director – Ilaiyaraaja
 Best Child Actor – Ali

References

External links 
 

1980s teen romance films
1980s Telugu-language films
1981 films
1981 romantic drama films
Best Telugu Feature Film National Film Award winners
Films directed by Bharathiraja
Films scored by Ilaiyaraaja
Indian interfaith romance films
Indian romantic drama films
Indian teen romance films
Nandi Award winners